Wabash High School is a public high school in Wabash, Indiana, United States with approximately 500 students in grades 9–12.

The nickname of the students and the athletic teams is "Wabash Apaches."

Demographics
The demographic breakdown of the 418 students enrolled in 2014-2015 was:
Male - 52.2%
Female - 47.8%
Native American/Alaskan - 1.0%
Asian/Pacific islanders - 0.5%
Black - 1.0%
Hispanic - 1.9%
White - 94.9%
Multiracial - 0.7%

51.7% of the students were eligible for free or reduced price lunch, making this a Title I school.

Athletics
The Wabash Apaches compete in the Three Rivers Conference. School colors are orange and black. The following IHSAA sanctioned sports are offered:

Baseball (boys)
State championship - 1986
Basketball (girls & boys)
Cross country (girls & boys)
Football (boys)
Golf (boys & girls)
Soccer (boys & girls) 
Softball (girls)
Swimming (boys & girls)
Tennis (girls & boys)
Track (boys & girls)
Volleyball (girls)
Wrestling (boys)

Notable alumni 

 Adelaide Steele Baylor (1860–1935), federal education official
 Gene Stratton-Porter (1863–1924), writer

Notable faculty 

 Mary E. Byrd (1849–1934), astronomer

See also
 List of high schools in Indiana

References

External links

 https://www.maxpreps.com/high-schools/wabash-apaches-(wabash,in)/soccer/home.htm

Public high schools in Indiana
Education in Wabash County, Indiana
Buildings and structures in Wabash County, Indiana